Castanopsis oviformis is a tree in the family Fagaceae. The specific epithet  is from the Latin meaning "egg-shaped", referring to the cupule.

Description
The brownish bark is scaly or cracked.

Distribution and habitat
Castanopsis oviformis is endemic to Borneo. Its habitat is hill dipterocarp and kerangas forests up to  altitude.

References

oviformis
Endemic flora of Borneo
Trees of Borneo
Plants described in 1968
Flora of the Borneo lowland rain forests